Individual Speedway Danish Championship is the National competition for Danish speedway riders to determine the champion of Denmark. The event was first held in 1947. From 1947 to 1951 there was no definitive difference between the short track and long track Championship of Denmark resulting in the same winner being recorded for both versions.

Qualification
Riders holding a Danish passport and a valid DMU licence. Riders must submit their entries at least four weeks before the first meeting of the competition. Any riders who competed in the Speedway Grand Prix or World Championship Qualifying rounds during the previous season are seeded directly to the Final. The DMU may also seed other riders directly to the Final at their discretion. Either one or two Semi-Finals are staged depending on the number of riders entering the competition (excluding the seeded riders who go straight through to the Final). Riders are selected for these rounds according to the previous season's Danish averages. If one Semi-Final is held, the highest-placed riders (plus two reserves) qualify the Final. If two Semi-Finals are held, the highest-placed riders (plus one reserve) from each meeting qualify for the Final.

The winner of the Final is awarded a gold medal and declared Danish Individual Champion. The riders finishing second and third are awarded silver and bronze medals respectively.

Previous winners

Medals classification

See also
 Danish Speedway League
 Danish Under 21 Individual Speedway Championship

References

Denmark
Speedway in Denmark